Two Great Guitars is a studio album by Bo Diddley and Chuck Berry, released in August 1964 by Checker Records, a subsidiary of Chess Records. It was the first studio album issued by Berry after his release from prison.

Diddley and Berry were friends, and both recorded for Chess. The album consists of two lengthy spontaneous instrumental jams and a few recently recorded instrumentals by the two guitarists; additional instrumental recordings, three by Diddley and one by Berry, are included in the compact disc reissue. The album cover shows a Gibson ES-350T owned by Berry and a guitar created by Diddley.

Track listing

Side one
 "Liverpool Drive" (Chuck Berry) – 2:56
 "Chuck's Beat" (Berry, Ellas McDaniel) – 10:39

Side two
 "When the Saints Go Marching In" (Traditional; arranged by McDaniel) – 2:52
 "Bo's Beat" (McDaniel, Berry) – 14:08

Reissue bonus tracks
 "Fireball" (McDaniel) – 2:51
 "Stay Sharp" (McDaniel) – 3:44
 "Chuckwalk" (Berry) – 2:30
 "Stinkey" (McDaniel) – 2:35

Personnel

Musicians
 Chuck Berry – guitar (tracks 1, 2, 4, 7)
 Bo Diddley – guitar (tracks 2, 3, 4, 5, 6, 8)
 Norma-Jean Wofford (aka The Duchess) – second guitar (tracks 3, 5, 8)
 Peggy Jones (aka Lady Bo) – second guitar (track 6)
 Jerome Green – maracas (tracks 2, 3, 4, 6)
 Lafayette Leake – piano (tracks 2, 4)
 Jesse James Johnson – bass guitar (tracks 2, 4, 6)
 Billy Downing – drums (tracks 2, 4)

Technical
 Andy McKaie – producer
 Ron Malo – engineer
 Esmond Edwards – cover photography
 Don Bronstein –  cover design and artwork

References

External links

Chuck Berry albums
Bo Diddley albums
1964 albums
Checker Records albums
Instrumental rock albums